Louis Van Hege (8 May 1889 – 24 June 1975) was a Belgian footballer who played as an inside-forward.

Club career
At club level, Van Hege played for Italian side A.C. Milan from 1910 to 1915, scoring 97 goals during five Italian Football Championship seasons with the rossoneri, and also serving as the club's captain. In terms of goals scored, he's the tenth-highest goalscorer in the club's history. He left Italy when the First World War began.

International career
At international level, Van Hege competed in the 1920 Summer Olympics as a member of the Belgium national team which won the gold medal in the football tournament.

Bobsleigh career
Van Hege also competed in bobsleigh at the 1932 Winter Olympics, finishing ninth in the two-man event.

Career statistics

Club 
Italian football championship statistics

References

External links
1932 bobsleigh two-man results

Milan Legend

1889 births
1975 deaths
A.C. Milan players
Belgian male bobsledders
Belgian footballers
Belgian expatriate footballers
Expatriate footballers in Italy
Belgian expatriate sportspeople in Italy
Bobsledders at the 1932 Winter Olympics
Footballers at the 1920 Summer Olympics
Footballers at the 1924 Summer Olympics
Olympic bobsledders of Belgium
Olympic footballers of Belgium
Olympic gold medalists for Belgium
Belgium international footballers
Olympic medalists in football
Medalists at the 1920 Summer Olympics
People from Uccle
Association football midfielders
Footballers from Brussels